The 4th Tennessee Cavalry Regiment was a cavalry regiment that served in the Union Army during the American Civil War. It was originally recruited as the 4th East Tennessee Cavalry.

Service
The 4th Tennessee Cavalry was organized at Cumberland Gap and mustered in for a three-year enlistment on February 9, 1863 at Nashville, Tennessee (TN) under the command of Colonel R. M. Edwards. Four companies were organized in Louisville, Kentucky from December 1862 through January 1863.

The cavalry was attached to the posts of:

 Nashville, Department of the Cumberland, to January 1864
 3rd Brigade, Cavalry Division, XVI Corps, Department of the Tennessee, to April 1864
 1st Brigade, 4th Division, Cavalry Corps, Army of the Cumberland, to June 1864
 Districts of Nashville and North Alabama, Department of the Cumberland, to October 1864
 1st Brigade, 4th Division, Cavalry Corps, Military Division Mississippi, to December 1864
 1st Brigade, 7th Division, Cavalry Corps, Military Division Mississippi, to February 1865
 2nd Brigade, 7th Division, Cavalry Corps, Military Division Mississippi, to February 1865
 2nd Brigade, 1st Division, Cavalry Corps, Military Division West Mississippi, to May 1865
 1st Brigade, 2nd Cavalry Division, West Mississippi, to July 1865

The cavalry was mustered out of service August 14, 1865 in Nashville.

Detailed service

 Duty at Camp Spear, Nashville to August 1863
 Green Hill, to June 14 
 Ordered to Carthage, TN to August 30; duty there and at Murfreesboro and Nashville to December
 Action at Friendship Church, September 29 
 Expedition to Memphis, TN, December 28–January 4, 1864
 Moved to Colliersville, January 14
 Smith's Expedition to Okolona, Miss., February 11–26
 Coldwater, February 11
 Holly Springs, February 12
 Near Okolona, February 18
 West Point, February 20–21
 Prairie Station, February 21
 Okolona and Tallahatchie River, February 22
 Ordered to Nashville, TN, February 27; duty there to June
 Duty on the line of the Nashville & Chattanooga Railroad and in District of North Alabama to July
 Decatur, Alabama (AL), June 1 (A detachment at Decatur to October 1864)
 Sand Mountain, July
 Rousseau's Opelika Raid from Decatur to West Point & Montgomery Railroad, July 10–22
 Near Coosa River, July 13
 Greenpoint and Ten Island Ford, Coosa River, July 14
 Opetika, Chehaw Station, and near Auburn, July 18
 Siege of Atlanta to August 5
 Scouts to England Cove, TN, July 7–9 and July 12–18 (detachments)
 McCook's Raid on Atlanta & West Point Railroad, July 27–31
 Near Campbellton, July 28
 Lovejoy's Station, July 29
 Clear Creek and near Newnan, July 31
 Chattahoochie River, July 31
 Ordered to Decatur, AL, August 5
 Near Pond Springs, AL, August 9 (detachment)
 Expedition from Decatur to Moulton, August 17–20
 Near Pond Springs August 18–19 (detachment)
 Rousseau's pursuit of Wheeler, September 1–8
 Operations against Forrest in eastern Tennessee, September 16–October 10
 Action at Pulaski, September 26–27
 At Nashville to December
 Action at Owen's Cross Roads, December 1
 Demonstration on Murfreesboro, December 5–7
 Wilkinson's Cross Roads near Murfreesboro, December 7
 Battle of Nashville, December 15–16
 Pursuit of Hood to the Tennessee River, December 17–28
 Hollow Tree Gap, Franklin and West Harpeth River, December 17
 Franklin, December 18
 Rutherford Creek, December 19
 Lynnville, December 23
 Anthony's Hill, December 25
 Sugar Creek, December 25–26
 Hillsboro, December 29
 Near Leighton, December 30
 Narrows, January 2, 1865
 Thorn Hill, January 3
 At Gravelly Springs to February
 Moved to Vicksburg, Miss., thence to New Orleans, Louisiana (LA) and Mobile Bay, AL, February 11–March 23
 Campaign against Mobile and its defenses, March 26-April 9
 Occupation of Mobile, April 12
 March to Montgomery, LA April, 13–25
 Ordered to Mobile April 27
 Expedition from Spring Hill, AL to Baton Rouge, LA, May 8–22
 Ordered to Nashville, May 27
 Garrison duty at Johnsonville to July

Casualties
The regiment lost a total of 234 men during service; 1 officer and 24 enlisted men killed or mortally wounded, 4 officers and 205 enlisted men died of disease or accident.

Commanders
 Colonel R. M. Edwards
 Lieutenant Colonel Jacob Montgomery Thornburgh - commanded at the battle of Nashville

See also

 List of Tennessee Civil War units
 Tennessee in the Civil War

References

 Dyer, Frederick H.  A Compendium of the War of the Rebellion (Des Moines, IA:  Dyer Pub. Co.), 1908.
 Eckel, Alexander. History of the Fourth Tennessee Cavalry, U.S.A., War of the Rebellion, 1861-65 (Johnson City, TN:  Overmountain Press), 2001.   [reprint of 1929 edition]
 Wiefering, Edna. Tennessee Union Soldiers Vol. 1 (Cleveland, TN:  Cleveland Public Library), 1996.
Attribution

External links
 Brief unit history, including officers' names, regimental strengths, etc.
 Site devoted to the history of the 4th Tennessee Cavalry

Military units and formations established in 1862
Military units and formations disestablished in 1865
Units and formations of the Union Army from Tennessee
1865 disestablishments in Tennessee
1862 establishments in Tennessee